Rossiteria is a genus of sea snails, marine gastropod mollusks in the family Trochidae, the top snails.

Description
The umbilicus is narrow. The columella is arcuate, obliquely plicate, terminating in a strong anterior tooth.

Species
Species within the genus Rossiteria include:
 Rossiteria nucleolus (Pilsbry, 1903)
 Rossiteria nucleus (Philippi, 1849)
 Rossiteria pseudonucleolus Poppe, Tagaro & Dekker, 2006
Species brought into synonymy
 Monilea (Rossiteria) nucleolus Pilsbry, 1903: synonym of Rossiteria nucleolus (Pilsbry, 1903)

References

 Wilson, B., 1993. Australian Marine Shells. Prosobranch Gastropods. Odyssey Publishing, Kallaroo, WA
 Higo, S., Callomon, P. & Goto, Y. (1999) Catalogue and Bibliography of the Marine Shell-Bearing Mollusca of Japan. Elle Scientific Publications, Yao, Japan, 749 pp

External links
 Brazier, J. (1895). Rossiteria, a new subgenus of the family Trochidae. Proceedings of the Linnean Society of New South Wales. 19: 728
 Fischer, P. (1875–1880). Genres Calcar, Trochus, Xenophora, Tectarius et Risella. In: Kiener, L. C. Spécies général et iconographie des coquilles vivantes.... Paris: J-B. Baillère et fils, Vol. 11. Pp. i–iii, 1–480

 
Trochidae
Gastropod genera